Verena Schott (born 6 March 1989) is a German paraswimmer and Paralympic medal winner.

Biography 
Schott was born in 1989 in Greifswald. At the age of three, she and her family moved to Bennewitz, Saxony; when she was eight, she took up swimming and joined a swimming club in nearby Wurzen. In 2002, she was severely injured riding her bicycle when a van hit her while overtaking. This left her with incomplete paraplegia and she now uses a wheelchair. She competes in the S7, SM6 and SB5 classifications.

In 2010 Schott left the club in Leipzig where she had been training when she moved to Berlin to study biology at the Humboldt University of Berlin. There she began training with Matthias Ulm at Berlin's Paralympic Sport Club (PSC Berlin). She had a son, Lean, in June 2011.

Schott competed at the 2010 IPC Swimming World Championships where she won silver medals in the SB5 100 m breaststroke and SM6 200 m individual medley. At the London 2012 Paralympics she reached the finals in four disciplines and won the silver medal in the SM6 200 m medley, coming second to Ellie Simmonds, who posted a world record time. At the 2013 World Championships she again came second in the 200 m medley, as well as winning bronze in the 100 m breaststroke.

Schott was at the World Para Swimming Allianz Championships in 2019 in London. She competed in the 100m backstroke S6 and took gold beating the world record holder Song Lingling.

References

External links 
 
 

1989 births
Living people
German female breaststroke swimmers
German female medley swimmers
German disabled sportspeople
S7-classified Paralympic swimmers
Paralympic swimmers of Germany
Paralympic silver medalists for Germany
Paralympic bronze medalists for Germany
Paralympic medalists in swimming
Swimmers at the 2012 Summer Paralympics
Swimmers at the 2020 Summer Paralympics
Medalists at the 2012 Summer Paralympics
Medalists at the 2020 Summer Paralympics
Medalists at the World Para Swimming Championships
Medalists at the World Para Swimming European Championships
Sportspeople from Mecklenburg-Western Pomerania
People from Greifswald
People from Bezirk Rostock
People with paraplegia